The Walch Revolver is a .36 caliber cap and ball black powder revolving action handgun, designed by Walch Firearms & Co. The revolver was patented in 1859 by John Walch.

Variants 
The revolver has two variants; a five-chamber model and a six-chamber model. Each variant is capable of firing two shots per chamber, when completely loaded. There are two hammers, and depending on the model, one or two triggers.

Production history 
Roughly 200 Walch Revolvers were produced between 1859 and 1862, making them quite rare.

References 

American Civil War weapons
Revolvers of the United States
Black-powder pistols
Early revolvers
Guns of the American West